"Don't Tell Me Nonsense" is a song by Nigerian singer D'banj. It serves as the seventh single from the album D'Kings Men (2013), a collaboration between members of D'banj's label DB Records. "Don't Tell Me Nonsense" peaked at number 1 on Afribiz's Top 100 Music Chart. Moreover, it peaked at number 1 on MTV Base's Official Naija Top 10 Chart from September 13 through September 19, 2013. The song also peaked at number 21 on YFM 99.2's Y Urban Top 40 chart.

Music video
The accompanying music video for "Don't Tell Me Nonsense" was shot in Lagos by Matt Max. It features helicopters, smoke bombs, and an army of dancers.

Accolades
The music video for "Don't Tell Me Nonsense" was nominated for Video of the Year, Best Afro Pop Video and Best Use of Choreography at the 2013 Nigeria Music Video Awards (NMVA). Moreover, it was nominated for Best African Act Video at the 5th edition of the 4Syte TV Music Video Awards.

Track listing
 Digital single

References

2013 singles
D'banj songs
2013 songs